Marcel Mouchel (13 February 1927, in Équeurdreville-Hainneville (Manche) – 7 March 2012) was a French footballer and manager.

He played as attacker for AS Cherbourg from 1945 to 1958, with one season at SM Caen (1952–53). At Cherbourg, Mouchel played under the management of George Kimpton, Maurice Blondel and Ernest Vaast, who helped him gain the skill needed to win nine caps for France Amateurs (1956–58).

Marcel Mouchel is one of the iconic players of AS Cherbourg, along with Jacky Simon.

After receiving many offers, Marcel Mouchel became a professional at 31, when he signed for CS Sedan – also the club of Zacharie Noah – (1958–62). With his final club, he won the Coupe de France as captain in 1961 against Nîmes 3–1, in Colombes (Hauts-de-Seine). He played a total of 111 matches in Division 1, all with Sedan (23 goals in the championship).

As a coach, Marcel Mouchel managed SM Caen (1962–64), UST Équeurdreville and AS Cherbourg (1970–71).

References

French footballers
AS Cherbourg Football players
CS Sedan Ardennes players
French football managers
Stade Malherbe Caen managers
AS Cherbourg Football managers
Sportspeople from Manche
1927 births
2012 deaths
Association football forwards
Footballers from Normandy